Narcissus pallidulus is a species of the genus Narcissus (Daffodils) in the family Amaryllidaceae. It is classified in Section Ganymedes. It is native to Spain.

Taxonomy
Opinions vary as the status of this taxon. Zonnefeld (2208) discusses its status, believing both on genetic information and morphology and distribution that it is a separate species from Narcissus triandrus. For instance the leaf width at 2mm is much smaller. While Webb (1980) and Barra Lazaro (2000) consider it a variety or subspecies of the type species of the section (N. triandrus). he is supported in this by both Dorda and Fernandez Casas (1989) and Perez-Barrales et al. (2006).

However officially according to the World Checklist and The Plant List it is considered Narcissus cernuus.

References

pallidulus
Garden plants
Flora of North Africa